The Gujarat Hybrid Renewable Energy Park is an under construction renewable energy park located near Vighakot village near Kutch district of Gujarat, India.

Project
When completed, the park will generate 30 gigawatt electricity from both solar panels and wind turbines. When completed, it will be the biggest hybrid renewable energy park in the world.

The composition of the park will be as follows:

The developers are obligated to install 50% of their allocated capacity by 2023 and complete the project by 2025. The Power Grid Corporation of India will manage the electric power transmission. It also accounts for 5 crore tonnes carbon emission reductions each year. The government also has plans to install 14 GWh grid-scale battery storage system.

History 
The proposal of the park was approved by the Government of Gujarat on 9 September 2020, allocating  of land. The proposal had mentioned total 41.5 gigawatt capacity. The foundation stone of the project was laid on 15 December 2020 by Indian Prime Minister Narendra Modi. The road leading to park is under construction as of April 2021 and expected to complete by December 2021.

See also
 Solar power in Gujarat

References

Kutch district
Solar power stations in Gujarat
Wind farms in India
Proposed renewable energy power stations in India